is a remix album by Japanese singer/songwriter Chisato Moritaka and DJ tofubeats, released on December 17, 2014 by Warner Music Japan. The album features remixes of Moritaka's hit songs and new tracks composed by tofubeats. To promote the album, the duo hosted the "Don't Stop The Music" First Album "Special Night @ WOMB" show in Shibuya on its release date.

Track listing 
All lyrics are written by Chisato Moritaka, except where indicated; all music is arranged by tofubeats.

References

External links 
 

2014 remix albums
Chisato Moritaka albums
Japanese-language compilation albums
Warner Music Japan compilation albums